Nikos Steliou (born 21 July 1967) is a Greek swimmer. He competed in the men's 50 metre freestyle event at the 1992 Summer Olympics.

References

1967 births
Living people
Greek male swimmers
Olympic swimmers of Greece
Swimmers at the 1992 Summer Olympics
Swimmers from Athens
Greek male freestyle swimmers